The Ghana Library Association (GLA) is the main professional organisation representing libraries and information services in Ghana. It was founded in 1962 by the West African Library Association (WALA). Eve Evans had started the WALA and she was to have an important role in creating a library service in Ghana.

The GLA is a registered professional association established under the Professional Bodies Decree NRCD 143 of 1973 with Registered No. PB 21 on 2 August 1986 in accordance with the laws of Ghana. It publishes the Ghana Library Journal, a peer-reviewed journal of Library science. The association has been in existence for over 54 years. It went through a period of activity and inactivity in the 1970s, but since 1983 it has been revived and growing steadily.

The Association has an elected governing council for a two-year tenure, chaired by the President, who sees to the running of the association.

The 20th President of the Association is Mrs. Comfort Asare, she is currently the acting Librarian at Wisconsin International University College.

Membership 

 Fellow
 Chartered Member
 Associate member
 Student
 Retired Member
 Life Member
 Ordinary member

Constitution 
There is a constitution which guides the activities of the association and this can be found here.

Code of ethics 
This is available here.

Membership of professional bodies 
The Association is a member of the following professional bodies:

 International Federation of Library Associations (IFLA)
African Library and Information Associations and Institutions (AfLIA)

List of presidents

See also 

 Ghana Library Board
Eve Evans

References

Bibliography

External links
Ghana Library Association

Libraries in Ghana